The Yasar Dogu Tournament 1986, was a wrestling event held in Izmir, Turkey between 16 and 17 September 1986. This tournament was held as 15th. There has been no international participation in 1986

This international tournament includes competition includes competition in men's  freestyle wrestling. This ranking tournament was held in honor of the two time Olympic Champion, Yaşar Doğu.

Medal overview

Men's freestyle

References 

Yasar Dogu 1986
1986 in sport wrestling
Sports competitions in Izmir
20th century in İzmir
Yaşar Doğu Tournament
International wrestling competitions hosted by Turkey